A ridgeline is the crest of a ridge. It may also refer to:

 Honda Ridgeline, a sport utility truck
 Ridgeline Open Space, a public park in Castle Rock, Colorado, United States
 Ridgeline High School (Utah), a public high school in Millville, Utah
 Ridgeline High School (Washington), a public high school in Liberty Lake, Washington
 Ridgeline Middle School, a school in the Yelm School District, Washington, United States